Kaggle, a subsidiary of Google LLC, is an online community of data scientists and machine learning practitioners. Kaggle allows users to find and publish data sets, explore and build models in a web-based data-science environment, work with other data scientists and machine learning engineers, and enter competitions to solve data science challenges. 

Kaggle was first launched in 2010 by offering machine learning competitions and now also offers a public data platform, a cloud-based workbench for data science, and Artificial Intelligence education. Its key personnel were Anthony Goldbloom and Jeremy Howard. Nicholas Gruen was the founding chair succeeded by Max Levchin. Equity was raised in 2011 valuing the company at $25.2 million. On 8 March 2017, Google announced that they were acquiring Kaggle.

Kaggle community
In June 2017, Kaggle claimed it surpassed 1 million registered users and, as of 2021, over 8 million. The users come from 194 countries.

By March 2017, the Two Sigma Investments fund was running a competition on Kaggle to code a trading algorithm.

Overview
 The competition host prepares the data and a description of the problem; the host may choose whether it's going to be rewarded with money or by unpaid.
 Participants experiment with different techniques and compete against each other to produce the best models. Work is shared publicly through Kaggle Kernels to achieve a better benchmark and to inspire new ideas. Submissions can be made through Kaggle Kernels, through manual upload or using the Kaggle API. For most competitions, submissions are scored immediately (based on their predictive accuracy relative to a hidden solution file) and summarized on a live leaderboard.
 After the deadline passes, the competition host pays the prize money in exchange for "a worldwide, perpetual, irrevocable and royalty-free license [...] to use the winning Entry", i.e. the algorithm, software and related intellectual property developed, which is "non-exclusive unless otherwise specified". 

Alongside its public competitions, Kaggle also offers private competitions limited to Kaggle's top participants. Kaggle offers a free tool for data science teachers to run academic machine-learning competitions. Kaggle also hosts recruiting competitions in which data scientists compete for a chance to interview leading data science companies like Facebook, Winton Capital, and Walmart.

Competitions

Hundreds of machine-learning competitions were run on Kaggle since the company was founded. Competitions have ranged from improving gesture recognition for Microsoft Kinect to making a football AI for Manchester City to improving the search for the Higgs boson at CERN.

Competitions have resulted in many successful projects including furthering the state of the art in HIV research, chess ratings and traffic forecasting. Geoffrey Hinton and George Dahl used deep neural networks to win a competition hosted by Merck. And Vlad Mnih (one of Hinton's students) used deep neural networks to win a competition hosted by Adzuna. This resulted in the technique being taken up by others in the Kaggle community. Tianqi Chen from the University of Washington also used Kaggle to show the power of XGBoost, which has since taken over from Random Forest as one of the main methods used to win Kaggle competitions. 

Several academic papers have been published on the basis of findings made in Kaggle competitions.  A key to this is the effect of the live leaderboard, which encourages participants to continue innovating beyond existing best practices. The winning methods are frequently written up on the Kaggle blog, Kaggle Winner's Blog.

Models
In February 2023, Kaggle introduced Models which allows users to discover and use pre-trained models through deep integrations with the rest of Kaggle’s platform.

Financials

In March 2017, Fei-Fei Li, Chief Scientist at Google, announced that Google was acquiring Kaggle during her keynote at Google Next.

See also 
Data science competition platform
Anthony Goldbloom

References

Further reading
"Competition shines light on dark matter", Office of Science and Technology Policy, Whitehouse website, June 2011
"May the best algorithm win...", The Wall Street Journal, March 2011
"Kaggle contest aims to boost Wikipedia editors", New Scientist, July 2011 
"Verification of systems biology research in the age of collaborative competition", Nature Nanotechnology, September 2011

2010 establishments in California
2017 mergers and acquisitions
Analytics companies
Applied machine learning
Computer science competitions
Crowdsourcing
Forecasting competitions
Google acquisitions
Google Cloud
Programming contests